Get Low is a 2009 drama film directed by Aaron Schneider, and written by Chris Provenzano and C. Gaby Mitchell. It tells the story of a Tennessee hermit in the 1930s who throws his own funeral party while still alive. The film stars Robert Duvall, Bill Murray, Sissy Spacek and Lucas Black. Duvall was awarded the Hollywood Film Festival Award for Best Actor for his lead performance.

Plot
No one really "knows" Felix Bush, who lives as a hermit in the woods. Rumors surround him, such as how he might have killed in cold blood, and that he's in league with the devil. So, the town is surprised when Felix shows up at Reverend Gassy Horton's church with a large roll of cash and requests a "funeral party" for himself, which Rev. Horton refuses to do. Frank Quinn, the owner of the local, financially troubled funeral parlor, covets Bush's money and agrees to advertise and help organize a funeral party. Townsfolk and others in the area are invited to come to the event and tell Felix Bush the stories they've heard about him. To ensure a good turnout, Bush insists upon a raffle, with his property as the prize; many people buy tickets at $5.00 dollars a piece.

Things get more complicated when an old mystery is remembered, involving a local widow named Mattie Darrow, who was Bush's girlfriend in their youth, and her deceased sister, Mary Lee Stroup. With the help of a preacher who insists upon the truth from forty years ago being revealed, Bush intends to confess his shame about and complicity in a terrible occurrence.  He reveals to Mattie his affair with her married sister, Mary Lee, telling her that it was Mary Lee who was his true love, his only love. To the people gathered for his funeral party, he tells the story of how the two of them made plans to run away together and, when she didn't arrive at the agreed place, he went to her home to search for her. He discovered that her husband had attacked her with a hammer, knocking her out. The husband threw a kerosene lamp against a wall to set the house on fire and kill himself, the unconscious Mary Lee, and Bush. Bush freed himself from the attacking husband, but as his clothes caught fire, he also saw Mary Lee catch fire. As he went to put the fire out, he felt himself flying through the window, possibly pushed by the husband, and he was unable to re-enter the house to save Mary Lee.

Mattie leaves the party, the raffle is held and a winner proclaimed. Later, after everything has been packed away and everyone has gone, Mattie returns; she seems to have forgiven Bush. He dies shortly after, walking toward who he sees as Mary Lee coming down the lane toward him.

His actual funeral service and burial is held in a small area of his property where he has, over the years, buried his animal companions. Charlie officiates the ceremony, with Reverend Gus Horton, Buddy, his wife and child, Mattie and Frank in attendance. After a short benediction from Charlie, Mattie places a portrait of her sister, Mary Lee, on Felix's casket, allowing them to be together, even if only figuratively. As his grave is filled, the mourners leave.

Cast
 Robert Duvall as Felix Bush
 Sissy Spacek as Mattie Darrow
 Bill Murray as Frank Quinn
 Lucas Black as Buddy Robinson
 Gerald McRaney as Rev. Gus Horton
 Bill Cobbs as Rev. Charlie Jackson
 Arin Logan as Mary Lee Stroup
 Lori Beth Edgeman as Kathryn Robinson
 Andrea Powell as Bonnie
 Rebecca Grant as Joan
 Scott Cooper as Carl
 Blerim Destani as Gary
 Chandler Riggs as Tom
 Danny Vinson as Grier
 Tomasz Karolak as Orville
 Andy Stahl as Photographer

Production
The film is loosely based on a true story that happened in Roane County, Tennessee, in 1938. Duvall's character, Felix Bush, was based on a real person named Felix Bushaloo "Uncle Bush" Breazeale. It was filmed entirely on location in Georgia, with support for the production provided by the Georgia Department of Economic Development.

Release
The film premiered at the Toronto International Film Festival and is distributed by Sony Pictures Classics. It was released on July 30, 2010, in the United States, opening in four cinemas and taking in a weekend gross of $90,900, averaging $22,725 per cinema. This placed the film at twenty-third overall for the weekend of July 30 to August 1, 2010. As of January 2011, the film had grossed $9,100,230 in North America and $401,361 in other territories, totaling $9,513,225 worldwide.

Reception
On review aggregator Rotten Tomatoes, the film has an approval rating of 85% based on 145 reviews, with an average rating of 7.20/10. The site's critics consensus reads: "Subtle to a fault, this perfectly cast ensemble drama is lifted by typically sharp performances from Robert Duvall and Bill Murray."  On Metacritic, the film has a weighted average score of 77 out of 100, based on 35 critics, indicating "generally favorable reviews".

Robert Duvall had overwhelming praise from critics, with John Anderson of The Wall Street Journal writing: "... Mr. Duvall... gives [the film] a heart." A New York Times review by A. O. Scott highlighted Duvall's "superb" performance as well.

Casey Burchby at DVD Talk noted that Get Low contains "a wonderful group of performances by a dream cast. Surprisingly, none of the leads were in the running for any of 2010's major awards."

Schneider won the Independent Spirit Award for Best First Feature for the film.

References

External links

 
 
 True story of Felix "Bush" Breazeale
 West Coast Midnight Run, Volume 2010, Coming Soon Film Reviews – Get Low, editorial essay and documentary on Get Low

2009 films
English-language German films
English-language Polish films
American drama films
Sony Pictures Classics films
2009 independent films
Films directed by Aaron Schneider
Films scored by Jan A. P. Kaczmarek
Films shot in Georgia (U.S. state)
Films set in Atlanta
Films set in Georgia (U.S. state)
2009 directorial debut films
Films about funerals
2000s English-language films
2000s American films